R. L. Paschal High School is a secondary school in Fort Worth, Texas, United States. It is part of the Fort Worth Independent School District, and is the oldest and largest high school in Fort Worth ISD.

The school is ranked 322nd in Texas and 3,892nd in the United States for best quality of education (in 2022) by U.S. News & World Report.

The following elementary schools feed into Paschal: Alice Carlson, George C. Clarke, Lily B. Clayton, Contreras, Daggett, De Zavala, South Hills, Tanglewood, Westcliff, and Worth Heights. 

The following middle schools feed into Paschal: Daggett Montessori, Daggett, McLean, McLean 6th Grade, Rosemont, and Rosemont 6th Grade.

History

The school originated as the city's first secondary school, Fort Worth High School, which opened in 1882. Fort Worth High School was originally located at 200 Jennings. Robert Lee Paschal, an attorney from North Carolina, became head teacher in 1906. Briefly known as Central High School, it moved to its current location on Forest Park Boulevard in 1955. When Principal Paschal retired in 1935, the school was renamed in his honor as RL Paschal High School.

Its rival is Arlington Heights. In 1963, a prank on Arlington Heights led to 46 arrests.
On November 19, 1969, a class of 1950 PHS alumnus and Apollo 12 astronaut, Alan Bean, brought a Paschal High School flag to the moon with him, and safely returned it to Earth. He donated the flag to the school, where it was displayed on the wall for decades.
In 1979, a student stole a bulldozer from a county construction site and rammed it into the Arlington Heights field house the day before the annual Heights-Paschal football game, completely leveling it.
In 1985, the school achieved a degree of notoriety when a gang called "Legion of Doom" was active at the school.

In 2006, the school won the Boys golf state championship.

In 2019 some area residents of Rosemont, in the portion zoned to Paschal, protested when they found the FWISD planned to rezone them to South Hills High School.

Attendance zone

In 2019 a portion of Rosemont was zoned to Paschal.

Performing arts
Paschal has a competitive show choir, "Vox".

Notable alumni

 Audrey Anderson - actress
 Norman Alden - actor
 Charlie Applewhite - singer and radio host
 Nandini Balial - former teacher in Fort Worth Independent School District, writer
 Nancy Lee Bass - "First Lady of Fort Worth," philanthropist
 Alan Bean - astronaut, walked on the Moon during Apollo 12
 Jim Bronstad - MLB pitcher 
 T Bone Burnett - musician
 Lila Cockrell - first woman mayor of a major metropolis in the United States
 Betsy Colquitt - English professor and poet
 Donald Curry - professional boxer 
 Tim Curry - former DA of Tarrant County
 Price Daniel - Governor of Texas 1957-63 and US Senator
 Aaron Dismuke - voice actor for Funimation
 Germán Durán - MLB player
 John Howard Griffin - writer of Black Like Me
 Gayle Hunnicutt - actress
 Dan Jenkins - sports writer
 Patti Karr - Broadway actress
 Joe Don Looney - football player
 Hoby Milner- MLB player and pitcher 
 Jeff Newman - MLB player and manager
 Charlie Mary Noble - astronomer and teacher
 Bill Owens - 1999-2007 Governor of Colorado
 Dan Hewitt Owens - actor
 Corporal Charles F. Pendleton - US Army recipient of Medal of Honor
 John Peterson - PGA golfer
 Richard Rainwater - billionaire investor
 Ginger Rogers - actress
 Frank Ryan - NFL quarterback
 Edward Dickson Reeder - artist
 Taylor Sheridan - actor, screenwriter, and director
 Bud Shrake - sports journalist, author, and screenwriter
 Marcel Spears- actor on The Neighborhood (TV series)
 Kathy Suder - artist
 Liz Smith - gossip columnist and author
 Charles D. Tandy - founder of Tandy Corporation (now Radio Shack)
 Karen T. Taylor - forensic and portrait artist
 Morton H. Meyerson - president of Electronic Data Systems, CTO General Motors
 Tommy Thompson - NFL player
 Bror Bror Utter - artist
 Von Wafer - basketball player
 Kaylon Geiger - NFL Player

Rivalries
 Arlington Heights High School (the oldest ongoing high school rivalry in Texas history).

References

External links

 

P
Fort Worth Independent School District high schools